Renaud de Dammartin (Reginald of Boulogne) (c. 1165 – 1227) was Count of Boulogne from 1190, Count of Dammartin from 1200 to 1214 and Count of Aumale from 1204 to 1214. He was son of Alberic III of Dammartin and Mathilde of Clermont.

Brought up at the French court, he was a childhood friend of Philip Augustus. At his father's insistence he fought for the Plantagenets. Received back into Philip's favour, he married Marie de Châtillon, daughter of Guy II de Châtillon and Adèle of Dreux, a royal cousin.

In 1191, Renaud's father, Alberic, kidnapped and had Renaud marry Ida, Countess of Boulogne. The County of Boulogne thereby became vassal to the French king, rather than the count of Flanders. While this marriage made Renaud a power, it also made enemies in the Dreux family and that of the count of Guînes, who had been betrothed to Ida.

In 1203, Renaud and his wife gave a merchant's charter to Boulogne. This was probably made for financial consideration. Philip made Renaud Count of Aumale the following year, but Renaud began to detach himself. Following the acquisition of Normandy in April 1204, King Philip granted Renaud the county of Mortain and the honor of Warenne which was centered on the fortresses of Mortemer and Bellencombre.  Both Mortain and Warenne had been held by William I of Boulogne and it would appear that King Philip recognized the Boulogne claim to them.

In 1211, he refused to appear before Philip in a legal matter, a suit with Philippe de Dreux, bishop of Beauvais. Philip II seized his lands and on 4 May 1212 at Lambeth, Dammartin made an agreement with King John who had also lost possessions to Philip. Renaud brought other continental nobles, including the Count of Flanders, into a coalition with John against Philip. In return he was given several fiefs in England and an annuity. Each promised not to make a separate peace with France.

With the Emperor Otto IV and Ferdinand of Flanders, he took part in the attack on France in 1214 culminating in the Battle of Bouvines. Commanding the Brabançons, he was on the losing side, but was one of the last to surrender, and refused submission to Philip Augustus. His lands were taken away, and given to Philip Hurepel. Renaud was kept imprisoned at Péronne for the rest of his life, which ended in suicide.  His daughter Matilda II was married to Philip Hurepel.

References

Sources

External links
 Historique Boulogne

1160s births
1227 deaths
Counts of Boulogne
Counts of Dammartin
Counts of Aumale
House of Dammartin
Counts of Mortain